The following page lists all power stations in Zimbabwe.

Coal

Hydroelectric

Proposed hydro power stations
Batoka Gorge Hydroelectric Power Station

Solar

See also 

 Energy in Zimbabwe
 List of power stations in Africa
 List of largest power stations in the world
 Zimbabwe Electricity Supply Authority

References 

Zimbabwe
 
Power stations